The National Independence Party (NIP) is a defunct political party in Ghana. It was formed in 1992 in the run up to the inauguration of the Fourth Republic of Ghana. The party came to an end in 1993 following a merger with another Nkrumahist party.

Formation
The NIP was founded in 1992 after the ban on political parties was lifted in May, 1992 by the Provisional National Defence Council government of Jerry Rawlings. The party was one of many that professed to follow the Nkrumah ideology. Other parties who also claimed Nkrumah heritage include the People's National Convention, the People's Heritage Party and the National Convention Party.

1992 elections
The NIP contested the 1992 Ghanaian presidential election on 3 November 1992. Its presidential nominee was Kwabena Darko, a multimillionaire entrepreneur. Kwabena Darko came fourth, winning 2.8% of the total votes cast. Although the international observers of this election declared it free and fair, the NIP together with three other parties, the New Patriotic Party, the People's National Convention and the People's Heritage Party claimed the elections were fraudulent and went on to boycott the parliamentary election held on 29 December 1992.

Merger
In 1993, during the first year of the Fourth Republic of Ghana, the NIP merged with the People's Heritage Party, another pro-Nkrumah party to form the People's Convention Party.

See also
List of political parties in Ghana

References

Defunct political parties in Ghana
Political parties established in 1992
1992 in Ghana